The YOG-83 was a gasoline barge built in January 1944 by the Concrete Ship Constructors of National City California for the Maritime Commission. It was in service as a gasoline barge in the Pacific before being moved and used during nuclear weapon testing. The testing was part of Operation Crossroads at Bikini Atoll. It was noted that the barge had incurred slight damage from general use during its service as a gasoline barge, but the damage was not significant and would not effect how the bomb testings would be rated.

Test Able 
Test A (or Test Able) was performed on July 1, 1946. Preliminary inspection indicated superficial damage to the barge only. Later detailed inspection confirmed the damage to be limited only to the top side of the barge. Damage included:
 The draft remained unchanged from the pretest.
 The roof dished downward slightly on amidships deck house.
 The wheelhouse roof was blown off.
 The steel frame life raft rack was pulled loose.
 There were blast burns on the poop deck frame structures.
 The wheelhouse and tankhouse frames were bent forward.
 There was charring on the forecastle.

Test Baker 
Test B (or Test Baker) was conducted on July 24, 1946. The YOG-83 suffered no apparent damage from this test. The radiation intensity allowed for fifteen minutes aboard each day initially for inspection.

References 

Nuclear weapons
Nuclear weapons of the United States
1946 in the United States